The following is a list of people executed by the U.S. state of California since capital punishment was resumed in 1976.

Since the 1976 U.S. Supreme Court decision of Gregg v. Georgia, the following 13 people convicted of murder have been executed by the state of California. The first 2 executions were by gas inhalation; all subsequent executions were by lethal injection, following a 1996 federal court (9th Circuit) ruling that the use of the gas chamber in California was unconstitutional. A further 2 people sentenced to death in California (Kelvin Malone and Alfredo Prieto) were executed in Missouri and Virginia.

See also 
 Capital punishment in California
 Capital punishment in the United States

Notes 


References

 
People executed
California
executed